The enzyme dihydroneopterin aldolase catalyzes the chemical reaction

2-amino-4-hydroxy-6-(D-erythro-1,2,3-trihydroxypropyl)-7,8- dihydropteridine  2-amino-4-hydroxy-6-hydroxymethyl-7,8-dihydropteridine + glycolaldehyde

This enzyme belongs to the family of lyases, specifically the aldehyde-lyases, which cleave carbon-carbon bonds.  The systematic name of this enzyme class is 2-amino-4-hydroxy-6-(D-erythro-1,2,3-trihydroxypropyl)-7,8-dihydropt eridine glycolaldehyde-lyase (2-amino-4-hydroxy-6-hydroxymethyl-7,8-dihydropteridine-forming). Other names in common use include 2-amino-4-hydroxy-6-(D-erythro-1,2,3-trihydroxypropyl)-7,8-, and dihydropteridine glycolaldehyde-lyase.  This enzyme participates in folate biosynthesis.

Structural studies

References

External links

EC 4.1.2
Enzymes of known structure